Cedric Smith (born 21 September 1943) is an English Canadian actor and musician. He played Alec King in the CBC television series Road to Avonlea and was the voice of Professor X in the X-Men TV series.

Music
Born in Bournemouth, Hampshire (now Dorset), England, Smith moved to Canada when he was about 10 years old. In 1961, he dropped out of high school to become a full-time folk singer. He was a member of the folk group Perth County Conspiracy, and wrote several songs that were performed and recorded by the band. Ca. 1963, he performed at the "Lemon Tree" a Dayton, Ohio coffee house for an extended time. Between sets he would read from a giant volume of Shakespeare. As a folk singer he sang at the "Ebony Knight" coffee house on Main Street in Hamilton in the mid '60s; he also had performances at the "Black Swan" coffee house in Stratford, Ontario in 1967 and 1968. He sang on Loreena McKennitt's album "Elemental" in 1985.

Acting
Smith won a Gemini Award for Best Performance by an Actor in a Continuing Leading Dramatic Role in 1993 for his part in Road to Avonlea. He appeared on the syndicated program Mutant X in its first season, as well as on the cult hit Forever Knight, alongside his then-wife, Catherine Disher.

He also provided the voice of Mentor on the short-lived Silver Surfer animated series, also on the Fox network. Smith also provides narration for Canada's History Television's series, Turning Points in History.

Personal life
Smith has a son named Darcy Montgomery Smith who was born in 1993. He is the ex-husband of Catherine Disher, who played Jean Grey on X-Men: The Animated Series alongside him.

Filmography

Film

Television

References

External links 

 

English male voice actors
English male television actors
Best Actor in a Drama Series Canadian Screen Award winners
1943 births
Living people
Canadian male voice actors
British emigrants to Canada